The Southwest Washington League was a Class-D level Minor League Baseball circuit based in the southwest region of Washington state that played three seasons from 1903 to 1906. The league teams played six times a week, but only the weekend games counted in the standings.

History

Teams in the league included the Aberdeen Pippins, Centralia Midgets, Hoquiam Loggers, Montesano Farmers and Olympia Senators. The first league president was John P. Fink of Olympia, Washington. He was succeed in 1904 by Colonel Fox of Aberdeen, Washington. The inaugural league championship was won by the Aberdeen Pippins, who finished the season with a .611 winning percentage. The Hoquiam Loggers won the league pennant in 1904 with a 13–4 win–loss record. During league meetings before the 1905 season, William E. Campbell of Hoquiam, Washington was elected league president.

Cities represented 
Aberdeen, WA: Aberdeen Pippins 1903–1905 
Centralia, WA: Centralia Midgets 1903–1904 
Hoquiam, WA: Hoquiam Perfect Gentlemen 1903–1904; Hoquiam Loggers 1905
Montesano, WA: Montesano Farmers 1905 
Olympia, WA: Olympia Senators 1903–1906

Standings & statistics

1903 Southwest Washington League
 The league played six times a week, but only the weekend games counted. Hoquiam refused to play off the tie; the championship was awarded to Aberdeen. 
 
1904 Southwest Washington League
 The league played six times a week, but only the weekend games counted. No individual Statistics Available. 
1905 Southwest Washington League 
 The league played six times a week, but only the weekend games counted. No individual Statistics Available.

See also
Northwest League
Washington State League
Western Tri-State League

References

External links
Baseball Reference

Defunct baseball leagues in the United States
1903 establishments in Washington (state)
1906 disestablishments in Washington (state)
Sports leagues established in 1903
Organizations disestablished in 1906
Defunct minor baseball leagues in the United States
Baseball leagues in Washington (state)